In plants, Suttonia is a junior synonym of the colicwood genus, Myrsine.

Suttonia is a genus of marine ray-finned fish, related to the groupers and classified within the subfamily Epinephelinae of the family Serranidae.

Species
There are currently 3 recognized species in this genus:
 Suttonia coccinea Endo & Kenmotsu, 2013 (Scarlet freckle-faced podge)
 Suttonia lineata Gosline, 1960 (Freckleface podge)
 Suttonia suttoni J. L. B. Smith, 1953

References

Grammistini